Raj Barr-Kumar  FAIA FRIBA, also known as Raj Barr, is an American architect, professor of architecture  and was the 1997 national president of the American Institute of Architects.

Personal life and education

Raj Barr was born in Colombo, British Ceylon, to Alexander Hamilton Barr-Kumarakulasinghe and Francesca Thanga-Ranee Winslow.  The Barr-Kumarakulasinghe family of Jaffna has a history as a family of distinguished professionals, and has long been recognized as "direct descendants of the ancient kings of Jaffna."  Raj was educated at the Royal Preparatory School and the Royal College, Colombo where he won the Steward Panel Prize and served as editor of the College Magazine and Prefect.

Raj earned a Bachelor of Science in Architecture and RIBA Part I from the University of Ceylon in 1971.  He earned  RIBA Part II and a Graduate Diploma in Architecture and Development Planning from the Bartlett School of Architecture at the
University of London in 1974.  Awarded the Ewart Memorial Scholarship for his performance at the University of London, he earned a Master of Architecture in Urban Design summa cum laude from the University of Kansas in 1975.  He earned a Doctorate of Architecture (ArchD.)in Sustainable Design summa cum laude from the University of Hawaii in 2003.

Career

Architect

Raj began his architectural career in Ceylon working with the firm Panditaratna & Adithya on the Kalutara Bodhiya Temple prior to attending architecture school.  He also worked with Geoffrey Bawa RIBA on the Triton Hotel, Valentine Gunasekara RIBA on the Tangalle Bay Hotel and the Catholic Chapel at Tewatte, and Justin Samarasekera RIBA on various projects throughout the county from 1966-71.

After graduating from the University of Ceylon in 1971 Raj moved to Hong Kong and worked with Jon Prescott RIBA on plans for Macau New Town and renovations to the historic Teatro Dom Pedro V.  Raj worked for the N-E Metropolitan Regional Hospital Board on York District General Hospital in the UK in 1972.  He joined Llewelyn-Davies Associates in 1973 and worked on The Military Hospital in Baghdad, the Doha Hotel in Qatar, and the Manama Conference Center in Bahrein.

Moving to Kansas City in 1974, Raj worked on the Hyatt Regency Hotel with Patty Berkebile Nelson Associates, The Menninger Foundation sanatorium in Topeka with Kiene & Bradley Associates, and on Rogers New Town, Arkansas with Seligson Associates.

As Senior Designer at Barrett Daffin and Carlin in Tallahassee, Florida, he designed the Suwannee River Water Management District HQ Building in 1979.

In 1981 Raj founded Barr-Kumar Architects Engineers PC and BARR Group International, LLC, commercial and residential architecture and engineering firms based in Washington, D.C.

Practice Experience

Practice experience includes Cortlandt Medical Center New York, Eco Maya Condominiums in Mexico, Altos Escondidos Eco Development in Panama, Aleid Eco Resort in Saudi Arabia, World Bank HQ, Hilton, Hyatt Regency and Kimpton Hotels; Rasika, Bibiana, Bombay Club and Ardeo Restaurants; the Washington National Cathedral, Masjid Noor and Jain Temple; Trinidad & Tobago, Sri Lanka and Malta Embassies; and numerous custom homes.

Educator

Raj's career as an educator began at the University of Kansas in 1975 where he served as an Assistant Professor until 1979.  He then served as Director and Tenured Associate Professor of the Florida Architecture Center in Washington, D.C. from 1979-84.

Raj served as an Associate Professor in the School of Architecture and Urban Planning at Howard University from 1986–94, and was named Emens Distinguished Visiting Professor at Ball State University in 1998. He joined the faculty at The Catholic University of America in 2003 and introduced the first course in sustainability on campus.  Raj served as Professor of Practice in the School of Architecture & Planning from 2007-12. Raj taught at the University of the District of Columbia from 2017 to 2020 with the express purpose of helping the Master of Architecture program achieve accreditation.  
Accredited in 2020, the program at the only public university in DC provides an affordable pathway to becoming a professional and provides upward mobility to many families.

Advocate & volunteer

Throughout his career as both a practitioner and an educator Raj has attempted to publicly champion the principles of sustainable design  as well as innovative approaches to addressing social problems including homelessness.

In 1996, Raj was nationally elected to serve as the National 1997 President of The American Institute of Architects (AIA) and became the first person of color to lead the organization in its 140-year history.

During his tenure, Raj pioneered the annual AIA Legacy Project at the organization's national convention in New Orleans.  He called for  every AIA National Convention to leave improvements to the built environment of the host city.  The first Legacy Project, an $11.5 million, 117,000 sf facility for New Orleans's homeless was called, "A model of cooperation and achievement."  The project has been replicated in every host city since 1997, improving schools, community centers, housing, and hospitals.

Honors and awards

Bibliography

Books

Green Architecture: Strategies for Sustainable Design -  (2003)
Sustainable Design Strategies -  (2010)
Fire Water Sound Motion: Re-thinking Mechanical Systems -  (2011)

Articles & Papers (Select)

References

External links
BARR Group International, LLC Official firm website.

20th-century American architects
Architects from Washington, D.C.
Living people
University of Kansas alumni
University of Hawaiʻi alumni
Alumni of Royal College, Colombo
Fellows of the American Institute of Architects
Presidents of the American Institute of Architects
American people of Sri Lankan Tamil descent
Sri Lankan Tamil architects
Sri Lankan emigrants to the United States
1946 births
20th-century Sri Lankan architects
21st-century Sri Lankan architects
21st-century American architects